Nine Nights is a film produced and written by Veronica McKenzie. It mainly revolves around the mourning which takes place for a dead child who is a twin and the other twin refusing to let go. The story is based on the mourning rituals which has to take place for nine nights and how family secrets gets revealed.

The movie won an award at PAFF Directors' Award in 2019.

Synopsis 
When her twin brother is hit by a car and killed, Marcie refuses to believe that he is dead and is adamant he’s still alive. The family begins the Caribbean mourning ritual ‘Nine Night’ designed to let the dead go. As the nights count down, Marcie comes face-to-face with her brother and her descent into paranoia, unleashes long-buried family secrets.

Cast 

 Malcolm Atobrah: Michael Haines
 Elizabeth Brace: Tina Ramadin
 Deborah Colphon: Miss May
 Paulette Harris-German: Sister P
 Jo Martin: Leonore Haines
 T'Nia Miller: Sylvie Johnson
 Mary Nyambura: Marcie Haines
 Premila Puri: Nurse Sandra
 Mark Redguard: Pastor Douglas
 Rizwan Shebani: Paul Jenner

References

External links 
 

2010s English-language films